Farewell or fare well is a parting phrase. The terms may also refer to:

Places
 Farewell, Missouri, a community in the United States
 Farewell and Chorley, a location in the United Kingdom near Lichfield, site of the former Farewell Priory

Films
 Farewell (1930 film) (German: Abschied), a film directed by Robert Siodmak
 Farewells (Polish: Pożegnania), a 1958 film directed by Wojciech Has
 Farewell (1967 film) (Gobyeol), a South Korean film starring Shin Young-kyun
 Farewell (1972 film) (Jagbyeol), a South Korean film starring Namkoong Won
 Farewell (1983 film) (Proshchanie), a film directed by Elem Klimov
 The Farewell (2000 film), a 2000 German film
 Farewell (2009 film) (L'affaire Farewell), a 2009 French film
 The Farewell (2019 film), a 2019 American film

Music

Groups and labels
 Farewell (band), an American pop-punk band

Classical
 Farewell Symphony, Symphony No. 45 by Haydn 
 Piano Sonata No. 26 (Beethoven), known as "Das Lebewohl" or "Les Adieux" ("The Farewell")
 Waltz in A-flat major, Op. 69, No. 1 (Chopin), called also The Farewell Waltz or Valse de l'adieu.
 "Farewell", the final movement in Waldszenen, op. 82 by Robert Schumann

Albums 
 Farewell (Divinefire album), 2008
 Farewell (Oingo Boingo album), 1996
 Farewell (Gil Evans album), 1986
 Farewell (The Seekers album), 2019
 Farewell (The Supremes album), 1970
 Farewell (Tomiko Van album), 2006
 Farewell (Toshiko Akiyoshi – Lew Tabackin Big Band album), 1980
 Farewell, a 2003 album by Clan of Xymox

Songs 
 "Farewell" (Bob Dylan song), 1963
 "Farewell" (Rihanna song), 2011
 "Farewell" (Rod Stewart song), 1974
 "Farewell", a single by Congreso
 "Farewell", by Avantasia from The Metal Opera
 "Farewell", by Eminem from Music to Be Murdered By
 "Farewell", by Freedom Call from Crystal Empire
 "Farewell", by Heavenly from Carpe Diem
 "Farewell", by Kamelot from Epica
 "Farewell", by Sentenced from Frozen
 "Farewell", a series of songs by Seventh Wonder from Tiara
 "Farewell", by Simple Plan from Taking One for the Team
 "Farewell", by The Yardbirds from Roger the Engineer
 "Farewell", composed by A. R. Rahman from the film soundtrack Million Dollar Arm
 "Drum bun" (meaning "Farewell"), a popular military and patriotic Romanian song

Other uses
 Farewell, the code-name of the KGB defector Vladimir Vetrov
 Farewell (Ayşe Kulin) (Turkish: Veda), a 2008 novel by Ayşe Kulin
 Farewell, a bronze relief by Ivan Zajec at Prešeren Monument, Ljubljana, Slovenia
 "Farewell", a 2006 episode of the television series 12 oz. Mouse

See also 
 
 Fare Thee Well (disambiguation)
 Farwell (disambiguation)